Joel David Rifkin (born January 20, 1959) is an American serial killer, who was sentenced to 203 years in prison for the murders of nine women between 1989 and 1993, though it is believed he had up to 17 victims.

Early life 
Rifkin's birth parents were both young college students and his biological father was an Army veteran. On February 14, 1959, when he was three weeks old, Rifkin was adopted by an upper-middle class couple living on Long Island.

Rifkin performed poorly in school due to learning disabilities, and was unpopular with classmates due to his poor social skills. He graduated from East Meadow High School in 1977, then attended classes at Nassau Community College, the State University of New York at Brockport, and the State University of New York at Farmingdale, but left before earning a degree. After leaving college, Rifkin became self-employed as a landscaper.

On February 20, 1987, his father, Bernard, committed suicide, overdosing after having suffered from prostate cancer for several months.

On August 22, 1987, Rifkin was arrested during a sex worker sting in Hempstead, New York, after offering an undercover female police officer money for sex.

Murders 
Rifkin committed his first murder on February 20, 1989, killing Heidi Balch in his home in East Meadow. He then dismembered her body, removing her teeth and fingertips, putting her head in a paint can which he left in the woods on a golf course in Hopewell, New Jersey, disposing of her legs further north, and dumping her remaining torso and arms into the East River around New York City. On March 5, 1989, Balch's severed head was discovered on the seventh hole of the golf course. On April 8, 1989, Balch's legs were found in Pequonnock Creek near Jefferson Township, New Jersey. Her remains were not identified until 2013.

It is assumed that Rifkin killed 16 more women during the next four years. He was implicated in Balch's murder after his arrest in 1993. Investigators determined in 2013 that Balch and the woman he described as his first victim were the same person.

Rifkin picked up Tiffany Bresciani, a sex worker who was working on Allen Street in Manhattan, on June 24, 1993. Tiffany was with her boyfriend, punk rock musician Dave Rubinstein. Rifkin told Rubinstein that she was going to be returning in 20 minutes. After Tiffany failed to return, Rubinstein called the police with a description of the 1984 Mazda pickup truck that Rifkin drove.

Arrest and trial
On June 28, 1993, state troopers patrolling Long Island's Southern State Parkway noticed the pickup truck without a license plate. After pulling Rifkin over, they found Bresciani's body under a tarpaulin.

He was found guilty of nine counts of second-degree murder in 1994, and sentenced to 203 years up to life in prison.

Prison life 
Prison officials decided in 1996 that Rifkin was so notorious that his presence in the general prison population could be disruptive. He was confined to his cell at the Attica Correctional Facility for 23 hours per day. He spent more than four years in solitary confinement, then was transferred to the Clinton Correctional Facility in Clinton County, New York. Rifkin sued, arguing that his solitary imprisonment was unconstitutional. In 2000, a state appellate court determined that prison officials had not violated his constitutional rights by housing him in isolation. Corrections officials said that Rifkin was imprisoned with more than 200 other inmates at Clinton who were not allowed into the general prison population.

Known victims

In popular culture
 The 2018 independent film Joel was based on Rifkin's life and crimes.
 In the Seinfeld episode "The Masseuse," Elaine's boyfriend is named Joel Rifkin (played by Anthony Cistaro) and references to the serial killer are made throughout the episode. At a New York Giants game they are attending, the crowd's reaction to her boyfriend's name when it is announced over the loudspeaker prompts him to agree to Elaine's suggestion to change his name. (Coincidentally, one of Elaine's suggestions for a new name was O.J., O.J. Simpson would be arrested for the murder of his ex-wife and her friend on June 12, 1994, six months after the episode aired on November 18, 1993, and be tried yet acquitted two years after airing on October 3, 1995).
 The Howard Stern Show producer Gary Dell'Abate briefly worked with Rifkin at a Record World location in New York.

See also 
 List of serial killers in the United States
 List of serial killers by number of victims

References

External links 
 Adoption:Uncharted Waters by David Kirschner, PhD includes three chapters detailing his psychological interviews with Rifkin prior to and during the trial.

1959 births
20th-century American criminals
American adoptees
American agnostics
American people convicted of murder
American people with disabilities
American prisoners sentenced to life imprisonment
American serial killers
Crimes against sex workers in the United States
Criminals from New York City
East Meadow High School alumni
Living people
Male serial killers
People convicted of murder by New York (state)
People from East Meadow, New York
Prisoners sentenced to life imprisonment by New York (state)